Thomas Circle is a traffic circle in Northwest Washington, D.C., in the United States. It is located at the intersection of Massachusetts Avenue NW, Vermont Avenue NW, 14th Street NW, and M Street NW. It is named for George Henry Thomas, a Union Army general in the American Civil War.

History
Thomas Circle was constructed as a traffic circle as part of the original L'Enfant Plan for the District of Columbia. The circle was named for American Civil War General George Henry Thomas.

A horse-drawn railway installed around the Circle in the mid-1860s led to development to the north. Paved roads and sewers soon followed, and the area quickly attracted wealthy residents. Luther Place Memorial Church was built in 1874 and the Portland Flats built in 1881.

In December 1938, construction began on a $680,000 tunnel that would allow Massachusetts Avenue's through-traffic to pass under the circle. This underpass opened on March 14, 1940. North-south running through-traffic lanes cutting through the center of the circle were added to improve traffic flow.

In October 2006, the D.C. Department of Transportation completed a 2.5-year, $6 million reconstruction of the Thomas Circle. The project included the addition of bike lanes, pedestrian crosswalks mid-circle (which hadn't previously existed), new in-circle traffic lights, better street lighting, and new sidewalks and landscaping. The biggest change, however, came with the elimination of the 14th Street through-lanes. The circle was restored to its original design according to the L'Enfant Plan, which allowed for a larger landscaped area inside the circle. The rehabilitation of Thomas Circle won an Honorable Mention in the "Historic Preservation" category of the Federal Highway Administration's Excellence in Highway Design awards for 2006.

As of the start of the 21st century, Thomas Circle is adjacent to the southern boundary of the Greater 14th Street and Logan Circle Historic District. The circle marks the boundary between "downtown 14th Street" and the "uptown 14th Street", the latter of which is a rapidly gentrifying gay neighborhood within the city.  D.C. city officials now consider Thomas Circle to be a "gateway" to the Logan Circle, Shaw, and U Street Corridor neighborhoods.

In April 2014, Thomas Circle became the eastern terminus of the M Street Cycle Track. This , west-bound only bicycling lane extends to 28th Street NW.

Statue

A statue of General George Henry Thomas by John Quincy Adams Ward was erected in Thomas Circle in 1879.

Gallery

See also
List of circles in Washington, D.C.
The Wylie Mansion

References

Bibliography

External links

DCmemorials.com

Squares, plazas, and circles in Washington, D.C.
Streets in Washington, D.C.
Logan Circle (Washington, D.C.)
Circle